Stig Lindberg (17 August 1916 in Umeå, Sweden – 7 April 1982 in San Felice Circeo, Italy) was a Swedish ceramic designer, glass designer, textile designer, industrial designer, painter, and illustrator.

One of Sweden's most important postwar designers, Lindberg created whimsical studio ceramics and graceful tableware lines during a long career with the Gustavsberg pottery factory. Stig Lindberg studied painting at the University College of Arts, Crafts and Design. In 1937, he went to work at Gustavsberg under Wilhelm Kåge. In 1949, he was named Kåge's successor as art director. From this period until he left Gustavsberg in 1980, he designed individual ceramic items, as well as factory produced ranges and lines of dinnerware. He achieved fame for his eccentric forms and whimsical decoration. He died from a myocardial infarction in 1982.

His work was featured at the Nationalmuseum in Stockholm from 11 May 2006 to 25 February 2007.

Career
 1937–1957 and 1970–1980 Gustavsberg porcelain, art director (1949–1957, 1972–1978)
 1947–1982 Nordiska Kompaniet, textile designer
 1957–1970 University College of Arts, Crafts and Design, Konstfack, senior lecturer
 1980–1982 Own studio, Italy

Awards
 1948, 1957  Milan Triennale, gold medal
 1951, 1954 Milan Trienalle, grand prix
 1954 Gold Medal Art Industrial Exhibition Madrid
 1955 Gold Medal at the First International Ceramics Festival in Cannes
 1957 Gregor Paulsson Trophy
 1962 Gold Medal at the First International Ceramics Festival in Prague
 1968 Prince Eugen Medal
 1970 honorary professorship by the Swedish Government
 1973 Faenza, Gold Medal

See also
Lisa Larson

References

External links

 Stig Lindberg Exhibition at National Museum, Stockholm, Sweden 
Stig Lindberg collection at MoMA, New York

1916 births
1982 deaths
People from Umeå
Swedish designers
Swedish illustrators
20th-century Swedish painters
Swedish male painters
Konstfack alumni
Recipients of the Prince Eugen Medal
Swedish ceramists
20th-century Swedish male artists